Tserenbaataryn Enkhbayar (born 3 July 1967) is a Mongolian wrestler. He competed at the 1988 Summer Olympics and the 1992 Summer Olympics.

References

External links
 

1967 births
Living people
Mongolian male sport wrestlers
Olympic wrestlers of Mongolia
Wrestlers at the 1988 Summer Olympics
Wrestlers at the 1992 Summer Olympics
Place of birth missing (living people)
20th-century Mongolian people
21st-century Mongolian people